The 1990 Segunda División de Chile was the 39th season of the Segunda División de Chile.

Provincial Osorno was the tournament's champion.

First phase

North Zone

South Zone

Second phase

North Zone - Promotion playoffs

North Zone - Relegation Playoffs

South Zone - Promotion Playoffs

South Zone - Relegation Playoffs

See also
Chilean football league system

References

External links
 RSSSF - List of Second Division Champions

Segunda División de Chile (1952–1995) seasons
Primera B
1990 in South American football leagues